North Dakota Highway 9 (ND 9) is a state highway in eastern North Dakota. It follows a zigzag pattern from U.S. Route 52 (US 52) and US 281 at Melville to ND 1 outside of Rogers. ND 9 originally extended to Canada, and at its current eastern terminus, it followed the route of what is now ND 1 south, but when US 52 was extended into North Dakota, ND 9 was truncated to its current terminus.

Route description 
The route starts at an intersection with US 52/US 281 near Melville. It then goes about  without any intersections, passing the Stutsman county line along the way. ND 20 then merges into the route from 86th Avenue, thus beginning the route's concurrency with ND 20. ND 20 then splits using 92nd Avenue in Courtenay.

History

ND 9 originally extended to the Canadian border along what is now US 52. At its current eastern terminus, the route turned south and followed current ND 1, then turned east and went through Valley City. East of Valley City, the highway turned south again and followed what is now ND 32. When US 52 was extended into North Dakota around 1935, ND 9 was truncated to its current alignment.

Major intersections

References

External links

The North Dakota Highways Page by Chris Geelhart
North Dakota Signs by Mark O'Neil

009